Arthur Jayasena Ranasinghe (4 January 1927 - 4 May 2022) (known as A. J. Ranasinghe) was a Sri Lankan politician, State Minister and diplomat. In the third 1994 Sri Lankan presidential election he was an Independent candidate and polled 22,752 votes. Ranasinghe was the first Director General of Tower Hall Theatre Foundation also he served as the Sri Lanka Deputy High Commissioner to Canada and later served as State Minister of Media  under President R. Premadasa's Government.

During the Premadasa regime, State Minister A. J. Ranasinghe used to be a master of worship and had no hesitation in extolling its virtues. Once when he was pictured prostrating before President Premadasa, his reaction was to say to the press, ” I will not only worship Ranasinghe Premadasa but will even lick his slippers, boil it and drink the broth as a soup’. The fact that he was called ‘serappu soupa’ after that was considered by him as a tag of honour. [1]

On May 4th, 2022 A. J. Ranasinghe died in his home surrounded by his loved ones. His Pansukulaya was held on May 5th, 2022.

See also
1994 Sri Lankan presidential election

References

External links
 "I won't be fooled as JR was" said Preme

1927 births
2022 deaths
Sri Lankan Buddhists
Government ministers of Sri Lanka
Members of the 9th Parliament of Sri Lanka
Ministers of state of Sri Lanka
Candidates in the 1994 Sri Lankan presidential election
Sinhalese politicians
People from Puttalam District